Windsor Township is a township in Cowley County, Kansas, USA.  As of the 2000 census, its population was 211.

Geography
According to the USGS, it contains two cemeteries: Gospel Ridge and Windsor.

The streams of Blue Branch, Cedar Creek, Chilocco Creek, Coon Creek and School Creek run through this township.

References
 USGS Geographic Names Information System (GNIS)

External links
 City-Data.com

Townships in Cowley County, Kansas
Townships in Kansas